Hooray for Boobies is the third studio album by American alternative rock and rap band Bloodhound Gang. It was released on October 4, 1999, in the United Kingdom and on February 29, 2000, in the United States. Produced by Jimmy Pop and Richard Gavalis, it is the band's second release with Geffen Records after One Fierce Beer Coaster (1996). This was the second and last album to feature drummer Spanky G, who left the band to finish his studies.

The album was a commercial success that generated favorable reviews and brought the Bloodhound Gang into the mainstream consciousness. In the US, it peaked at number 14 on the Billboard 200 chart. It reached number one in Austria and Germany.

Five singles were released from the album: "Along Comes Mary", "The Bad Touch", "The Ballad of Chasey Lain", "Mope", and "The Inevitable Return of the Great White Dope". "The Bad Touch" was listed on 14 charts worldwide, and reached number one on five of them.

Background and development

In March 1995, the Bloodhound Gang signed a record deal with Columbia Records and released their debut studio album, Use Your Fingers, that July, but were subsequently dropped by the label. After adjusting its lineup, the group began working on their second album, One Fierce Beer Coaster.

Released on December 3, 1996, it eventually sold over 500,000 copies in the US. The album's first single, "Fire Water Burn", played a major role in the slow build of interest that ultimately led to the band's mainstream breakthrough. Geffen Records signed the band within two months as word-of-mouth praise for the album spread.

Music

Style

The album, reminiscent of the band's first album, features various skits in between songs. The first of these skits, entitled "Mama's Boy" is an impromptu phone conversation between Jimmy Pop and his mother. "R.S.V.P." features a short monologue from Vivid pornstar Chasey Lain. "That Cough Came With a Prize" is 15 seconds of coughing. "This Is Stupid" is an arbitrary track performed by the vocal duo who feature in "Right Turn Clyde." Finally, "The Ten Coolest Things About New Jersey" is simply ten seconds of silence. According to the liner notes, Jimmy Pop had to explain the track to band member DJ Q-Ball.

Lyricism
"A Lap Dance Is So Much Better When the Stripper Is Crying" is a parody of the narrative of Red Sovine's "trucker songs".

Release and promotion
"Right Turn Clyde" features a chorus parodying Pink Floyd's hit single "Another Brick in the Wall Part II"; "All in all you're just another dick with no balls." Because of the issue, the album was delayed in the US. It was eventually resolved and the album was finally released in the US. In Europe, the album was initially released without the song or "Take the Long Way Home", thus containing only 45 CD tracks. Later pressings featured the complete track list. The original version of "Take the Long Way Home", containing samples of someone saying "May I have your attention please? May I have your attention please?" before the verses and "That's enough. I said that's enough!" at the end of the song, can be heard on the 1999 acetate CD and a 2016 CD reissue of the album. Australian editions of the album only ever contained 45 tracks – the album was never reissued there with the complete track list, however in recent years, US imports with the complete track list have been available for sale in Australian shops.

A "clean" version of the CD was released titled simply Hooray. It featured an alternative cover image of a cow's udder.

The track "The Inevitable Return of the Great White Dope" appeared on the Scary Movie soundtrack.

The track "Magna Cum Nada" appeared in the movie Loser.

A double vinyl version of the album, with the American track listing, was released in 2000 and is currently out of print. A new single vinyl release, on blue vinyl and with the original European track list, was released on 22 July 2016. Neither vinyl release includes the hidden track. A third reissue was announced for 28 February 2020 as a double album, with "Take the Long Way Home" and "Right Turn Clyde", on transparent vinyl.

Reception

Critical response

Hooray for Boobies received generally positive reviews. Many reviewers complimented the album's duncical, but ultimately enjoyable, humor. AllMusic reviewer Stephen Thomas wrote, "on one hand, it's easy to hate the Bloodhound Gang. [...] On the other hand, you almost have to admire the lengths that they go to be, well, defiantly stupid." Many reviewers also complimented the album's eccentric plunderphonic-esque approach to music. PopMatters reviewer Patrick Schabe compared the Bloodhound Gang to Beck, saying, "if anomalous characterization, synthesis, and a popular culture repertoire make Beck the big brother of postmodern music, then surely he’s part of a family? If so, then perhaps the Bloodhound Gang are the snotty, juvenile, teenage brother in that family."

Not all reviews were complimentary. Many critics criticized the band for its heavy use of outdated music and its toilet- and sex-based humor. Entertainment Weekly writer Doug Brod decried the album, saying "on Hooray for Boobies these knuckleheads tap into '80s-style metal and New Orderish dance-wave to back their dumbbell odes to oral sex, porn stars, revenge, and – did I mention oral sex?"

Commercial performance
Hooray for Boobies debuted on the Billboard 200 at number 19 on March 18, 2000. Four weeks later, on April 15, the album peaked at number 14, selling 85,924 copies. 24 weeks later, the album slipped to number 199, and fell out of the chart a week later, having spent a total of 29 weeks there. On May 17, 2000, it was certified both gold and platinum by the Recording Industry Association of America (RIAA) on the same day.

Track listing

Notes
 The CD release shows 47 tracks but the ones after track 18 are either empty or the sound for the hidden track.
 "Take the Long Way Home" and "Right Turn Clyde" do not appear on the European or Australian releases of the album.

Personnel

Band members
Jimmy Pop – lead vocals, guitar, keyboards, sampling, production
Lüpüs Thünder – guitar, programming
Spanky G – drums
Evil Jared – bass
DJ Q-Ball – vocals, co-lead vocals (track 5), turntables, keyboards, programming

Other personnel
Rich Gavalis – engineer, editing, mixing, assist producer
Derron Nuhfer – saxophone
Tavis Werts – trumpet
Rich Balling – trombone
Darrin "Dangerous" Pfeiffer – drums (Track 6)
Parry Gripp – vocals
Chasey Lain – vocals
Production
 Avery Lipman – executive producer
 Monte Lipman – executive producer
 Joseph M. Palmaccio – mastering

Charts

Weekly charts

Year-end charts

Certifications

References

1999 albums
Bloodhound Gang albums
Geffen Records albums
Alternative rock albums by American artists
Rap rock albums by American artists
Rap metal albums